NEG Micon was a Danish wind turbine manufacturer. It was formed in 1997 as a result of a merger between Nordtank Energy Group (NEG) and Moerup Industrial Windmill Construction Company (Micon).

The company was merged with another Danish wind turbine manufacturer, Vestas, in 2004, and it is now operating under that name. The company produced wind turbines for many different countries including Canada, Denmark, Germany, Sri Lanka and United States.

NEG Micon turbine had 35 different models, and were very popular in the wind power industry, particularly the NM-48, NM-52, NM-72, and NM-82 turbines; and can be seen throughout major wind farms around the world.

References

External links
 

Manufacturing companies of Denmark
Defunct wind turbine manufacturers
Manufacturing companies established in 1997
Defunct companies of Denmark
1997 establishments in Denmark
2004 disestablishments in Denmark
Manufacturing companies disestablished in 2004
2004 mergers and acquisitions